Certified Risk Analyst (CRA) is a risk management professional designation offered by the Academy of Finance & Management.  CRA risk management training and certification is available in New York, California, Asia, the Middle East and other locations.

The CRA is a Graduate Post Nominal Designation that is available for risk managers with (i) an accredited master's degree, law degree, MBA, CPA, PhD, or specialized executive training, as well as (ii)  "substantial experience in risk assessment and management on a regional and global level" in parallel.

See also

References

External links 
American Academy of Financial Management

Professional certification in finance
Risk management in business